Any Wednesday is a 1966 American Technicolor romantic comedy film starring Jane Fonda, Jason Robards, and Dean Jones. It was directed by Robert Ellis Miller from a screenplay by producer Julius J. Epstein based on the Broadway play of the same name by Muriel Resnik, which ran for 984 performances from 1964 to 1966. The film was titled Bachelor Girl Apartment in the UK.

The story centers on a Manhattan woman (Fonda) who is trying to decide between two suitors, one married (Robards) and one not (Jones), on the day of her 30th birthday.

Plot
John Cleves (Jason Robards) is a businessman with an office in New York and a home in New Jersey. On one day of each week, Wednesday, he spends the night in the city, lying to wife Dorothy (Rosemary Murphy) that he is out of town on business when he actually is seeing Ellen, his mistress (Jane Fonda).

A business client from Akron, Ohio, Cass Henderson (Dean Jones), comes to town and is unable to find a hotel room for the night. Cleves' new secretary knows of an "executive suite" the boss maintains in town, so Cass is sent there for the night. When he meets Ellen, he mistakenly assumes she is a certain kind of lady hired by Cleves to entertain him.

The secretary compounds the error by telling Dorothy about the apartment. Dorothy goes there and discovers Ellen and Cass, assuming them to be a young couple. The women take a liking to each other so Dorothy invites them to spend an evening out on the town with her and John.

Dorothy eventually catches on to what her husband is up to and leaves him. Ellen invites her to use the apartment. John goes there and tries to win his wife's love back, but she just tells her husband to come visit her on any Wednesday.

Cast
Jane Fonda as Ellen Gordon
Jason Robards as John Cleves
Dean Jones as Cass Henderson
Rosemary Murphy as Dorothy Cleves, reprising her role from the Broadway production.
Ann Prentiss as Miss Linsley
Jack Fletcher as Felix
King Moody as Milkman
Kelly Jean Peters as Girl in Museum
Monty Margetts as Nurse

Production
Exterior location scenes for Any Wednesday were filmed in Manhattan, New York City.

During the course of the 28-month run of the play Any Wednesday on Broadway, the role of Ellen was played by Sandy Dennis – who won a Tony Award for her performance – and Barbara Cook. Don Porter and Gene Hackman also appeared in it.

Critical reception
Richard F. Shepard of The New York Times was fairly positive, writing that the story had made the transition from stage to screen "not much the worse for wear," though he felt "it might have been better if it were shorter. The funny lines, and there are a good number, would have been even sharper." Variety called it "an outstanding sophisticated comedy" with "solid direction and excellent performances." Philip K. Scheuer of the Los Angeles Times wrote, "Neither Jason Robards nor Jane Fonda strikes me particularly as a 'natural' comedian (whatever that may be) and the timing of both seems off ... In the case of Robards, a superior actor whenever he is permitted to be, I must admit to some surprise that he was willing to waste his time and talents on such a contrived and cinematically weak affair as this." Richard L. Coe of The Washington Post called Fonda "miscast" because she "is simply not the sort of girl who doesn't know what she is doing." He thought Rosemary Murphy stole the film with an "immensely amusing" performance. The Monthly Film Bulletin wrote, "A moderately entertaining film version of a Broadway stage production; but it could have been much more so if director Robert Ellis Miller had a lighter touch."

Awards and honors
Jane Fonda was nominated for a 1966 Golden Globe Award in the category "Best Performance by an Actress in a Motion Picture - Musical or Comedy".

Home media
On August 18, 2009, Warner Home Video released the movie on DVD-R as part of the Warner Archive Collection.

See also
List of American films of 1966

References
Notes

External links
 
 
 
 
 

1966 films
1966 romantic comedy films
Adultery in films
American romantic comedy films
American sex comedy films
1960s English-language films
Films scored by George Duning
American films based on plays
Films directed by Robert Ellis Miller
Films set in New York City
Films shot in New York City
Warner Bros. films
1960s sex comedy films
1966 directorial debut films
1960s American films